KXKT (103.7 FM) is an American radio station broadcasting a country music format. Licensed to Glenwood, Iowa, United States, the station serves the Omaha area.  The station is owned by iHeartMedia, Inc. and licensed as iHM Licenses, LLC. KXKT's studios are located at 50th Street and Underwood Avenue in Midtown Omaha, while its transmitter is located at the Omaha master antenna farm at North 72nd Street and Crown Point.

History

Rock/Top 40 (1980-1992)
KXKT started as KJAN-FM, an album rock station. It gradually moved to Top 40, competing against KQKQ-FM ("Sweet 98"). The call letters changed to KOMJ in 1988 and then to KXKT in 1990. With the tower originally in Atlantic, Iowa, "103.7 The Kat" struggled against the heritage and popular "Sweet 98."

Alternative (1992) 
In April 1992, the station began adding more alternative rock music in the playlist. By summer of 1992, the station turned to a more straight forward alternative playlist.

Country (1992-present) 
However, at Midnight on October 6, 1992, KXKT would abruptly flip to country as "KT-103". The last song before the flip was "If I Can't Change Your Mind" by Sugar, while the first song under the country format was by Travis Tritt. "KT-103, Omaha's Continuous Country"  kept the same on-air staff (many who had never played country music before), a rarity in the radio industry, where flipping formats usually results in new on-air staffs.

KXKT is licensed by the U.S. Federal Communications Commission to broadcast in the HD (hybrid) format.

References

External links

XKT
Radio stations established in 1980
IHeartMedia radio stations